The 2017–18 Welsh League Cup (known for sponsorship purposes as The Nathaniel MG Cup) was the 26th season of the Welsh Premier League's cup competition, which was established in 1992.

Played under a regionalised, knock-out format, the 2017–18 competition was the fourth to be held since the tournament was expanded to include clubs from outside the Welsh Premier League. As well as the 12 Welsh Premier League clubs from the previous season, the top five qualifying clubs from the northern and southern feeder leagues would enter the tournament, along with a number of wildcard entrants. 

The New Saints reached their tenth final and won the match 1–0, retaining the trophy and securing their ninth title. Their opponents were fellow Welsh Premier League side Cardiff Met who made their first appearance in the final.

First round

Ties were played on 29 & 30 August 2017.

The semi-finalists from the previous season, The New Saints, Barry Town United, Connah's Quay and Carmarthen Town received a bye to the second round.

|-

|}

Second round

Ties were played on 3 October 2017.

|-

|}

Quarter-finals

Ties were played on 24 October 2017.

|-

|}

Semi-finals

Ties were played on 15 & 22 November 2017 respectively. 

|-

|}

Final

The match was played on Saturday 20 January 2018 at Park Avenue, Aberystwyth. It was the 13th time the venue had hosted the final.

The tie was broadcast live on S4C.

External links

Welsh League Cup seasons
League Cup
Wales